Michael Mellemseter (born 12 November 1998 in Trondheim) is a Norwegian curler. He currently plays third on Team Andreas Hårstad.

Personal life
He started curling in 2005 at the age of 7. As of 2019, he was a student.

Teams

Men's

Mixed

Mixed doubles

References

External links

Video: 

Living people
1998 births
Sportspeople from Trondheim
Norwegian male curlers
Norwegian curling champions
Curlers at the 2016 Winter Youth Olympics
21st-century Norwegian people